Tha Dogg Pound Gangsta LP is the sixth studio album by rapper Daz Dillinger. It was released on January 25, 2005 through D.P.G. Recordz.

Track listing
"That's the Way We Ride" (feat. Shorty B & DJ Easy Dicc) 5:02
"Do You Think About"  (feat. Shelly) 3:54
"Everybody Givin' It Up"  (feat. Shelly) 4:12
"'N Tha Yard (Interlude)" 1:18
"Nothin' Can Stop Us Now" (feat. George Clinton) 4:53
"Do U Know" 4:32
"The Funeral (Skit)" 0:56 
"Fucc Dreamin' Tha Same Dream"  (feat. Andrea Gray) 4:15
"My Mama Said" 4:18
"My Ambitionz Az a Ridah 2005" 4:16
"Hey, How Ya' Doin'" 4:33
"Come Close" (feat. Nate Dogg) 4:07
"Rocc Wit Daz" 4:11
"Bomb Azz Pussy 2005" 4:22
"Nigga Gotta Hustle It Up" 4:49
"Gittin' Buccwild" 4:23
"Git a Dose of Dis Hot Ish" 3:49
"Tha Dogg Pound Gangsta" 4:15 
"Fuck Tha Police 2005" 2:01

Album chart

References

2005 albums
Daz Dillinger albums
Albums produced by Daz Dillinger
Albums produced by Fredwreck